The 1924 TCU Horned Frogs football team represented Texas Christian University (TCU) as a member of the Southwest Conference (SWC) during the 1924  college football season. Led by second -year head coach Matty Bell, the Horned Frogs compiled an overall 4–5 record with a conference mark of 1–5, placing last of eight team in the SWC. TCU played their at Clark Field, located on campus in Fort Worth, Texas.

Schedule

References

TCU
TCU Horned Frogs football seasons
TCU Horned Frogs football